Aestuariihabitans is a bacterial genus from the family of Rhodobacteraceae with one known species (Aestuariihabitans beolgyonensis).

References

Further reading 
 

Rhodobacteraceae
Monotypic bacteria genera
Bacteria genera